Oybin is a municipality in the Görlitz district, in Saxony, Germany, located very close to the border of the Czech Republic. Following the defeat of the Protestant armies by the Habsburgs in the Battle of the White Mountain in 1620, many Protestant Czechs found refuge across the border in the hills of Upper Lusatia. It is a "Kurort", a resort or spa certified by the state, where people go for rest and recuperation. It is most famous for its mountain of the same name, an exposed natural sandstone dome that towers above the town. The ruins of a medieval monastery lend a wild romantic beauty to it and it was a favorite subject of 19th-century Romantic painters like Caspar David Friedrich. Many bizarrely shaped geological rock formations can be found in the surroundings. The scenic narrow gauge Zittau–Kurort Oybin/Kurort Jonsdorf railway runs from Oybin to Bertsdorf, from there to the neighboring municipality of Jonsdorf and the town of Zittau. Oybin municipality has 3 districts: Oybin, Hain and Lückendorf.

Culture and Sights 
 a baroque mountain church built in 1734
 Periodic historical monk processions lit by torchlight
 Oybin railway station with small museum about the history of the Zittau Narrow Gauge Railway
 Teufelsmühle ("Devil's Mill")

Surroundings and Landmarks 
 Rosensteine (Rose Stones) with Kelchstein (Chalice Rock), a red mushroom rock
 The Große Felsengasse (Large Canyon Alley) with Muschelsaal (Shell Hall) and the via ferrata "Alpiner Grat"
 Mount Scharfenstein (Sharp Stone)
 Mount Hochwald (Highwood) with look-out tower and 2 mountain huts
 Mount Töpfer (Potter) with mountain hut
 Ameisenberg (Anthill rock)
 Mount Oybin

References

External links

Oybin Castle and Monastery
Mountain church Oybin
Historical monk processions on Mount Oybin

Zittau Mountains
Populated places in Görlitz (district)